Ilija Ivić (Serbian Cyrillic: Илија Ивић; born 17 February 1971) is a Serbian former professional footballer who played as a striker. A skillful attacker who showed great technical ability, Ivić could often be found in a supporting attacking role, opening up spaces for teammates. He played once for the national team of his country, against Switzerland in September 1998. He was a former technical director of AEK Athens.

Playing career
His football career began in 1986 at Proleter Zrenjanin, where he stayed until 1991. He played for three years at Red Star Belgrade (until 1994). With Red Star, he won the Yugoslav national championship with Red Star in 1991–92, the season after he joined from first club Proleter, for whom he scored 26 goals in 92 games. He was a FR Yugoslavia Cup winner with the Belgrade club in 1993 and departed the following season for Greece and Olympiacos after registering 16 goals in 30 top-flight games, where he stays until 1999.

While at Olympiacos he won the Greek championship in 1997, 1998, and the double in 1999, having his best campaign in the second of those title triumphs, claiming 26 goals in 32 matches. He was a member of Olympiacos squad in 1998–99 UEFA Champions League, when his team achieved its greatest success in European competition while they reached the quarter finals and being eliminated by Juventus.

His next step was with Italian club Torino the following season, although he failed to find the net in 19 games, nine as a substitute in his first season in Serie A. Having failed to break into the first team the following term, he returned to Greece with Aris Thessaloniki, before he signed for AEK Athens in early 2002.

In January 2002 Ivić came to AEK, where he closed his football career. He played 48 matches and he scored 18 times. His team finished second in the Greek Championship, equal points with Olympiacos, however he reached with his team the Final in the Greek Cup, where AEK met his past team Olympiacos. Ivić scored the winning goal in the 2002 Greek Cup final for AEK against Olympiacos but refused, for sentimental reasons, to celebrate, having played for the opposition earlier in his career.

The following season, he played a considerable part in AEK finishing third in the Alpha Ethniki after scoring nine goals in 20 games. In the UEFA Champions League he featured in five of AEK's six drawn games in the first group stage.

Post-playing career
In June 2004, Ivić accepted the proposal of AEK Athens administration and assumed the position of technical director. Ivić stayed for almost three years as the technical manager of AEK and during his career had a successful choices of players despite been given a small budget. In February 2007 he resigned and appealed that he had some collaboration problems with the current manager of AEK, Lorenzo Serra Ferrer. In June 2007, Ivić accepted the proposal of Petros Kokkalis, the management director of Olympiacos and assumed the position of technical manager. He resigned as technical director of Olympiacos on 7 May 2008. Ivić also resigned from Red Star in the end of 2008–09 season because of financial problems of the club. In August 2019, he signed as the technical director of AEK Athens, where he resigned in December 2021.

Personal life
He is the older brother of the former footballer and current football manager Vladimir Ivić.

Honours
Red Star Belgrade
Yugoslav First League: 1992
FR Yugoslavia Cup: 1993

Olympiacos
Greek Championship: 1997, 1998, 1999
Greek Cup: 1999

Torino
Serie B: 2001

AEK Athens
Greek Cup: 2002

External links
 

1971 births
Living people
Serbian footballers
Serbian expatriate footballers
Serbia and Montenegro international footballers
Yugoslav footballers
Association football forwards
AEK Athens F.C. players
Olympiacos F.C. players
Red Star Belgrade footballers
Aris Thessaloniki F.C. players
FK Proleter Zrenjanin players
Expatriate footballers in Italy
Torino F.C. players
Sportspeople from Zrenjanin
Yugoslav First League players
Super League Greece players
Serie A players
Expatriate footballers in Greece
Serbia and Montenegro expatriate footballers
Serbia and Montenegro footballers
Serbia and Montenegro expatriate sportspeople in Greece
Serbia and Montenegro expatriate sportspeople in Italy
Serbian expatriate sportspeople in Greece
AEK F.C. non-playing staff
Aris Thessaloniki F.C. non-playing staff